The Upstate Illini Conference (UIC) was a high school conference in northwest and north central Illinois. The conference participated in athletics and activities in the Illinois High School Association. The conference included small public and private high schools with enrollments between 75-1,000 students in Bureau, Boone, Carroll, DeKalb, Jo Daviess, Kane, Lee, McHenry, Ogle, Stephenson and Winnebago counties.

History
The name Upstate Illini was originally given to a collection of 15 schools primarily coming from five conferences, the Blackhawk, Route 72, Northwestern Illinois, SHARK and US Grant. The 15 original teams included: Ashton, Chadwick, Durand, Elizabeth, Franklin Center, Hanover, Leaf River, Milledgeville, Mt. Carroll, Orangeville, Pearl City, Rockford Lutheran, Scales Mound, Shannon and Thomson. This league began play in 1974, however within two years the league would lose over half of the teams based primarily on football. The teams which left either returned to their original conference or began play under a new moniker, the Northwest 8 Conference. The remaining teams, all without football, maintained the name Upstate Illini. The teams that stayed within the conference, were Chadwick, Elizabeth, Hanover, Scales Mound, Shannon and Thomson.

Eventually talks for a re-branding of the Northwest 8 took place in 1987, due to the fact that it had grown to 12 teams and was looking to expand beyond that number. In 1988, the Upstate Illini Conference was reconstructed and schools from the Northwest 8 joined, competition for all sports, with the exception of football, was established. In 1991, football schedules were set with 6 teams in the North Division: Durand, North Boone, Pearl City, Rockford (Lutheran), Elizabeth (River Ridge)-Warren (coop) and South Beloit and the South Division: Ashton-Franklin Center, Kirkland-Hiawatha, Milledgeville, Mt. Carroll, Mt. Morris and Polo.

In 1994, Mt. Morris was merged into the Oregon School District and dropped out of the conference. In that same year, Huntley joined and the divisions were realigned into East - Durand, Huntley, Kirkland-Hiawatha, North Boone, Rockford Lutheran and South Beloit and West - Ashton-Franklin Center, Milledgeville, Mt Carroll, Pearl City, Polo, River Ridge and Warren. In 1991, Pecatonica joined the league for all sports except football, due to existing schedules in the Mid-Northern, however, in 1992 joined the East Division.  In 1995 Huntley dropped out and East Dubuque, Forreston and La Moille were added to the West Division while Ashton-Franklin Center moved from the West division to the East.  In 1996 the Northwestern Illinois Conference (NWIC) and Upstate Illini merged under the Upstate Illini banner.  Based on these new additions, three divisions were formed West - Dakota, East Dubuque, Galena, Lena-Winslow, Orangeville, River Ridge, Stockton and Warren. East - Ashton-Franklin Center, Durand, Kirkland-Hiawatha, North Boone, Pecatonica, Rockford Lutheran and South Beloit. South - Forreston, Freeport Aquin, Lanark (Eastland), Milledgeville, Mt. Carroll, Pearl City and Polo. In 1999 Savanna was added to the South Division and Rockford Christian Life to the East Division making the total number of teams 24 for football, 26 overall, the largest conference in Illinois outside of the Chicago Public League. The year 2000 was the last year under the Upstate Illini name because six schools (Ashton-Franklin Center, Durand, Kirkland-Hiawatha, North Boone, Pecatonica and South Beloit) left in 2001 to form the Four Rivers Conference.  Rockford Lutheran and Rockford Christian Life also departed the conference in 2001, seeking competition more suited to their locations and size by joining the Private School League.  The remaining schools realigned under the Northwest Upstate Illini Conference banner.

All-Time Membership
The Upstate Illini Conference had various divisions throughout its history, the list of schools encompasses all of the schools which were once a part of the conference.

♦ Elizabeth and Hanover consolidated creating the River Ridge CUSD in 1985.
♥ Shannon and Lanark consolidated creating the Eastland CUSD in 1986.
♣ Chadwick and Milledgeville consolidated creating the Chadwick-Milledgeville CUSD in 1989.
° Leaf River ceased operations and was merged into Forreston High School in 1990
³ Mt. Morris ceased operations and was merged into Oregon High School in 1995
♠ Ashton and Franklin Center consolidated creating Ashton-Franklin Center High School in 2004
• Mount Carroll, Savanna and Thomson consolidated, creating the West Carroll School District in 2006.
* River Ridge High School relocated to Hanover, IL in 2004.

Membership timeline

References

External links

High school sports in Illinois
Illinois high school sports conferences